Gift Muzadzi (born 2 October 1974, in Salisbury) is a former Zimbabwean footballer who now is a coach for Eagles FC of Zimbabwe.

On 13 April 2016, Dynamos F.C. sacks Muzadzi as their goalkeeping coach.

References

1974 births
Living people
Sportspeople from Harare
Zimbabwean footballers
Zimbabwean expatriate footballers
Zimbabwe international footballers
Radomiak Radom players
Lech Poznań players
Dynamos F.C. players
Zimbabwe Saints F.C. players
Hellenic F.C. players
Sporting Lions F.C. players
Mighty Wanderers FC players
Ikapa Sporting F.C. players
Gunners F.C. players
Expatriate footballers in Poland
Zimbabwean expatriate sportspeople in Poland
Expatriate soccer players in South Africa
Zimbabwean expatriate sportspeople in South Africa
Expatriate footballers in Malawi
Zimbabwean expatriate sportspeople in Malawi
Association football goalkeepers
2006 Africa Cup of Nations players